Funky Melody is the fifth studio album from freestyle music singer Stevie B, released on November 1, 1994 by Thump Records. It includes the singles "Funky Melody", "Dream About You" and "If You Still Love Me". In Japan, the album was released on June 7, 1995, under the name Dream About You, and includes three bonus tracks. The album remained on the chart for two weeks in Japan, peaking at 92. In Canada, the album reached No. 29. The mellow tracks "Dream About You" and "Waiting For Your Love" are popular in the Philippines as well.

The single, "Dream About You", was the most successful single from the album, and also the last single from Stevie B to achieve great success, reaching No. 29 on the Billboard Hot 100 in the US. The track "Funky Melody" reached No. 30 on the Rhythmic Top 40 chart.

The song "Dream About You" has been covered by a few singers upon its success. In December 2007, an unknown Vietnamese amateur singer, who later goes by the name Tanh N. Braxton, made a traditional album of Vietnamese songs, named "Không bán", however he recorded his version of "Dream About You" as a bonus track. An audio clip was published on his YouTube channel on March 08th, 2022 being considered his official release of the cover version after more than 14 years since its recording. The original photo of the art cover used in this clip was taken by New York film director / photographer / art designer Duke Nguyen during a photoshoot of Tanh in 2010.

Track listing 

Japanese Edition

Charts

References

Stevie B albums
1994 albums